Imagabalin (INN, USAN; PD-0332334) was an investigational drug that acted as a ligand for the α2δ subunit of the voltage-dependent calcium channel, with some selectivity for the α2δ1 subunit over α2δ2. It was under development by Pfizer as a pharmaceutical medication due to its hypothesized anxiolytic, analgesic, hypnotic, and anticonvulsant-like activity. It reached phase-III clinical trials for treatment of generalized anxiety disorder; however, the trials were terminated by the manufacturer. The drug is no longer under development.

See also 

 Atagabalin
 PD-217,014
 Gabapentinoids

References

Amino acids
Anxiolytics
Calcium channel blockers
GABA analogues
Pfizer brands
Experimental drugs